Harrison Bergeron is a 1995 cable science fiction television movie film loosely adapted from Kurt Vonnegut's 1961 dystopian  short story of the same name. It was produced for Showtime and first screened on August 13, 1995. It was released to VHS in 1998.

Plot
Harrison Bergeron lives in the fictional suburban town of Madison, Rhode Island in the year 2053. The audience is told that after the second American Revolution, which started during an ongoing economic depression that was a result of a combination of technological advancement and a widening disparity between the very rich and the very poor, it was mandated that all people be equal in all things. To this end, the social norm of this society has become dystopian egalitarianism. Citizens are pushed to strive to be of equal wealth, intelligence, athletic prowess and social status to all around them. Through a process of selective breeding, mankind is perfecting the perfectly average human being. What is not accomplished through arranged marriages is made up for through technological means, the most prominent of which are showing only mind numbing TV shows, and a headband device worn by all citizens which modulates intelligence, dialing a person's IQ up or down in order to arrive at a 'perfect' 100.

There are limits to the success of the devices, however, and Harrison Bergeron is one such case. He is a total failure in school, consistently receiving A's (C is the desired grade). Even though he has been held back four years and his headband is consistently modified to dampen his intelligence, he still continues to excel to the embarrassment of him and his family.

Harrison goes to see a doctor about his intelligence problem, and after several tests it is determined that the headband is unsuccessful because Harrison's synaptic connections reroute themselves after each adjustment in order to overcome the inhibitions the headband is designed to place on the thought process. He is told that he will have to have an operation akin to a lobotomy in order to permanently lower his intelligence.

In his last day with a fully functioning brain, he goes to a "head house", where, in a parody of a bordello, men make plans to make high-end educational conversation with exceptionally smart women. Illegal device-free women are paid to play chess and conduct intelligent conversations with the clients. His first intelligent conversation ever with "mind whore" Phillipa is interrupted by a police bust. While the raid on the police station is underway Phillipa addresses a hidden camera saying not to take him away, and that she likes him. While being held captive in the police station, he is approached by a special agent who offers him an alternative to the lobotomy - to join what turns out to be the secret elite that runs the government.

Harrison falls in love with Phillipa there, but he illegally impregnates her and she is lobotomized for trying to escape.  He feels he can no longer continue to betray his values and decides to take action. He breaks into a TV studio and reveals the truth about the secret society to the viewers. Eventually, the guards break through, and later on he is forced to make an appearance on TV and pretend the broadcast was not real. Instead, he uses his chance to commit suicide by shooting himself in front of the viewers. The story is framed by an additional perspective from Bergeron's parents, who are watching the incident on TV, but who, because of his father's handicapping due to his superior intelligence and his mother's less than average intelligence, cannot concentrate enough to appreciate what occurs nor remember it.

In a final scene, a young boy and his friend get together in his bedroom to watch the first four hours of Bergeron's broadcast, without their bands. Downstairs, one boy's mother looks up the stairs with a look of recognition on her face; she is seen to be Phillipa.

Cast
Sean Astin as Harrison Bergeron
Miranda de Pencier as Phillipa
Eugene Levy as President McCloskey
Mairlyn Smith as Janet Mckloskey 
Howie Mandel as Charlie (of 'Chat with Charlie')
Andrea Martin as  Diana Moon Glampers
Christopher Plummer as John Klaxon
Nigel Bennett as Dr. Eisenstock
Peter Boretski as Newman
David Calderisi as Commissioner Benson
Emmanuelle Chriqui as Jeannie
Hayden Christensen as Eric
Cindy Cook as Weatherperson
Roger Dunn as George Bergeron
Jayne Eastwood as Ms. Newbound
Hal Eisen as TV Announcer - San Quentin
Matthew Ferguson as Garth Bergeron
Michael Fletcher - Technician
John Friesen as Frank the Plumber
Linda Goranson as Hazel Bergeron
Richard Monette as Eric Shockley
Quyen Hua as Wang

Production and release
Harrison Bergeron was filmed in Toronto, Ontario, Canada and the University of Toronto Scarborough campus.

Awards
Harrison Bergeron was nominated in four categories at the 1996 Gemini Awards for Best Direction, Best Performance by an Actor in a Supporting Role, Best Production Design or Art Direction and Best Sound.

References

External links

Harrison Bergeron at 
Harrison Bergeron at 

1995 science fiction films
1990s dystopian films
1995 films
Dystopian films
Films about educators
Films based on works by Kurt Vonnegut
American science fiction television films
Films based on science fiction short stories
Films shot in Toronto
University of Toronto
English-language Canadian films
Canadian science fiction television films
Films directed by Bruce Pittman
1990s American films
1990s Canadian films
Films set in 2053
Films set in Rhode Island